The 2016 Women's European Championship was the 21st annual rugby tournament organised by FIRA for the continent's national teams, and also acted as a qualification tournament for 2017 Women's Rugby World Cup.

Teams

  (Host)

Standings

Pool A

Pool B

Fixtures

Round 1

Round 2

Round 3

Round 4 (place games)

Final standings

Scotland and the winner of European Championship (Spain) played a home-and-away series to determine the final European qualifier for the 2017 Women's Rugby World Cup.

Statistics

Leading point scorers

Leading try scorers

References 

2016
2016 rugby union tournaments for national teams
International women's rugby union competitions hosted by Spain
2016–17 in European women's rugby union
rugby union
rugby union
rugby union
rugby union
rugby union
rugby union
2016–17 in Spanish rugby union